Ninos is a given name and a surname. Notable people with this name include the following:

Given name
Ninos (priestess), Athenian priestess
Ninos Aho (1945 – 2013), Assyrian poet and activist
Ninos Gouriye (born 1991), Dutch footballer
Ninos Khoshaba (born 1070), Iranian-Australian politician
Ninos Nikolaidis (born 1998), Greek rower

Surname
Tony Ninos (1919-2014), American politician and businessman
Cindy Ninos (born 1972), Greek skeleton racer

See also

Niños Héroes
 Niño (name)
 Nino (name)
 Niños (disambiguation)
 Nios (disambiguation)
 Nines (disambiguation)
 Nanos (disambiguation)